Nartey is a surname. Notable people with the surname include:

 Eddie Nartey (born 1984), Ghanaian actor, director, and producer
 Emmanuel Nartey (born 1983), Ghanaian judoka
 Jemima Nartey, Ghanaian volunteer organizer
Felix Nartey, Ghanaian social entrepreneur and open advocate